The Island School is located 1 mile (1.6 km) from Powell Point near the southwesternmost tip of Eleuthera, Bahamas.

Semester programs
The Island School offers two 14-week semester programs each year and a 6-week summer term. Fall semester begins in late August and runs through early December and spring semester begins in late February and ends in the beginning of June. Summer term runs from late June to early August.

Fall and spring semester program students complete a course of study in seven classes including Island School Seminar, Marine Ecology, Applied Scientific Research, Literature and Writing, Histories of the Bahamas, Applied Mathematics, and Land and Environmental Art. Students also participate in weekly Community Outreach classes with the Deep Creek Middle School. Summer programs focus on Applied Scientific Research and Human Ecology.

History
The Island School was founded in 1999 by Chris and Pam Maxey with support from the Lawrenceville School in New Jersey. Chris Maxey taught at the school and in 1996, he received the Joukowsky Fellowship allowing him to work towards his master's in Marine Resource Management at the Rosenstiel School of Marine and Atmospheric Science at the University of Miami. He initiated the Cape Eleuthera Marine Conservation Project (now the Cape Eleuthera Foundation) and began to set the framework to build a school and research station at Cape Eleuthera in The Bahamas. Construction on the campus began in fall 1998. On March 15, 1999, Pam and Chris started the first 14-week, one-hundred-day Island School semester which included 22 students and 6 faculty members.

Facilities
What began as a three-building campus grew into a diverse system of interconnected facilities. The current campus comprises a faculty office and school store, two large dormitory buildings, four main classrooms, a boathouse, dining hall with outside patio seating, a student life and medical center, two two-story faculty apartment buildings, two open-air gazebos, a living-roof multi-use building, a farm and orchard, a bio-diesel production facility, wood shop, a resource processing center, and in addition, the adjacent campus which hosts the Cape Eleuthera Institute.

Ecological design
The 10-acre (4-hectare) campus is powered by systems that allow the school to reduce its ecological impact. Rainwater from the roofs is captured for use, and collected into a system of cisterns with 82,000 gallon (310,403 liter) storage capacity. Water is heated through solar thermal collectors. Buildings are designed and constructed from local materials where possible and without air-conditioning. Furniture for the school is hand-crafted on campus out of Casuarina, a local invasive species of tree. The school generates the majority of its electricity through its 29 kW photovoltaic array and 10 kW wind turbine mounted on a 100 ft (30 m) tower above campus. The school seeks to transform its waste outputs through its constructed wetland which captures nutrients, and filters waste water before being used to irrigate landscaping. The school seeks to revolutionize its waste processing through the adaptation of its newly constructed bio-digester which will convert human waste into usable energy. In 2003, a student research group pioneered the biodiesel program which annually transforms 18.000 gallons of waste cooking oil, collected from local restaurants and cruise ships. The biodiesel powers Island School's fleet of 9 boats and 11 vehicles, and backup generators. The school's permaculture, aquaculture, and aquaponics programs, seek to reduce the amount of food imported annually. The school also invests in local agriculture by partnering with farmers to provide locally sourced fruits, vegetables, and meats.

Outdoor programs
Students undergo PADI Open Water Scuba Certification so that the ocean can become their classroom. They learn about concepts of marine ecology and then interact with knowledge through direct observation of the marine world. Marine Ecology class take place primarily in the ocean, with students diving in order to study these ecological concepts. Students may also be required do dive as part of their coursework in Research classes.

All students participate in two expeditions during the course of the semester. The initial three-day kayak trip teaches basic skills of ocean kayaking, camping, team building and serves as an introduction to exploring the island. The kayak expedition takes students to the southern point of Eleuthera while further developing students’ kayaking skills and focusing on leadership training. The sailing expedition focuses on group dynamics in the tight quarters of a small sailing vessel, giving students leadership roles throughout the trip. Both expeditions culminate with a 48-hour solo experience in which students are spread out individually in assigned spaces along Lighthouse Beach. Solos are overseen by on-site faculty who support this opportunity for self-discovery.

References

Semester schools
Educational institutions established in 1999
Schools in the Bahamas
1999 establishments in the Bahamas
Eleuthera